Milites Templi (Latin for "Soldiers of the Temple") was a papal bull issued by Pope Celestine II in 1144.

It ordered the clergy to protect the Knights Templar and encouraged the faithful to contribute to their cause.  It allowed the Templars to make their own collections once a year, even in areas under interdict.

This is one of the most important papal bulls relating to the Temple, and together with Omne datum optimum (1139) and Militia Dei (1145) forms the foundation for the Order's future wealth and success.

References

Sources

Knights Templar
1144 works
12th-century papal bulls
Documents of Pope Celestine II